KZLX-LP (106.7 FM) is a radio station broadcasting a Top 40/Urban Contemporary format.  The station is located in Maryville, Missouri, and serves the Maryville area.  The station is run by students of Northwest Missouri State University.

It started as KDLX in 1960 as a carrier current station and broadcast only in Northwest buildings.   During the period when John Jasinski was faculty advisor, the station received a Marconi Award for nation's most outstanding college radio station in 1992. On June 19, 2002, it became a low power station broadcasting with 42 watts effective radiated power and antenna 45.7 meters height above average terrain.

References

External links
KZLX official website
 

ZLX
Northwest Missouri State University
ZLX-LP
ZLX-LP
Radio stations established in 2002
2002 establishments in Missouri